Piëdro Schweertman (born 5 September 1983, in Vlissingen) is a professional squash player from the Netherlands. He reached a career-high world ranking of World No. 63 in August 2015.

References

External links 

1983 births
Living people
Dutch male squash players
Sportspeople from Vlissingen